This is a list of all the players who have captained the Montenegro national football team.

Mirko Vučinić was the first captain of the Montenegro national football team since its establishment in 2007.

Also Mirko Vučinić wore the captain band the most times: 36.

Stevan Jovetić is the current captain of the national team.

List of captains

List of captaincy periods of the various captains throughout the years.

Players in bold are still active. Years in italics indicate last year, when still an active player was a captain.

References

Captain
Montenegro captains
Association football player non-biographical articles